Arbulu (Arbulo in Spanish) is a hamlet and council located in the municipality of Elburgo/Burgelu, in Álava province, Basque Country, Spain. As of 2020, it has a population of 90.

Geography 
Arbulu is located 18km east-northeast of Vitoria-Gasteiz.

References

Populated places in Álava